Big Cat Records is a British independent record label. It launched around 1990 and originally specialized in industrial and noise-rock releases. Big Cat operated a US office in New York City for a few years. Integrated with V2 Records in 1996, at which point their roster became much more diverse in style. Artists include Carter The Unstoppable Sex Machine, Cop Shoot Cop, Foetus, Heather Nova, Paul Schütze, Pavement, Shudder To Think, Lotion, Corduroy, Junior Delgado, Blumfeld, Broken Dog, Experimental Audio Research, One Minute Silence and Grandaddy.

References

Record labels established in 1990
British independent record labels